Golden Acre may mean:
Golden Acre (Cape Town), a large shopping centre
Golden Acre Park in Yorkshire, England

See also
Goldenacre, area of Edinburgh, Scotland
Golden Acres (disambiguation)